Marinomonas polaris is a psychrohalotolerant, aerobic and motile bacterium from the genus of Marinomonas which has been isolated from coastal sea water from the Kerguelen Islands.

References

Oceanospirillales
Bacteria described in 2006